Spencer Armstrong Pumpelly (April 11, 1893 – December 5, 1973) was a Major League Baseball pitcher. Pumpelly played in one game for the Washington Senators against the St. Louis Browns on July 11, . He entered in the bottom of the 6th inning, with the Senators trailing the Browns 2–9, and allowed a home run to Marty McManus, walked Baby Doll Jacobson, induced a pop-out from Pinky Hargrave, and induced a 6-4 double-play from Gene Robertson to end the inning.

References

External links

1893 births
1973 deaths
Major League Baseball pitchers
Baseball players from New York (state)
Washington Senators (1901–1960) players